The Sonoita AVA is an American Viticultural Area located in southeast Arizona, south of the city of Tucson. The Sonoita area is a basin surrounded by three mountain ranges, the Huachuca Mountains, the Santa Rita Mountains, and the Whetstone Mountains. The soil is alluvial fans of gravelly loam that retains scarce water well.

References 

American Viticultural Areas
Arizona wine
1984 establishments in Arizona